Testudina is a genus of fungi in the family Testudinaceae. This is a monotypic genus, containing the single species Testudina terrestris.

References

Tubeufiaceae
Monotypic Dothideomycetes genera